Pekka Lairola (7 January 1928 – 10 April 2001) was a Finnish breaststroke swimmer. He competed in two events at the 1960 Summer Olympics.

References

External links
 

1928 births
2001 deaths
Finnish male breaststroke swimmers
Olympic swimmers of Finland
Swimmers at the 1960 Summer Olympics
Sportspeople from Turku